Saint Mary's Catholic Church is a historic church at 101 W. Church in Victoria, Texas.

It was built in 1903 by the Bailey Mills contracting firm.  It was also a work of Fred Urban.

It was added to the National Register of Historic Places in 1986.

See also

National Register of Historic Places listings in Victoria County, Texas
Recorded Texas Historic Landmarks in Victoria County

References

External links

Roman Catholic churches in Texas
Churches on the National Register of Historic Places in Texas
Gothic Revival church buildings in Texas
Roman Catholic churches completed in 1903
Churches in Victoria County, Texas
National Register of Historic Places in Victoria, Texas
Recorded Texas Historic Landmarks
20th-century Roman Catholic church buildings in the United States